MOFA or Mofa may refer to:
Ministry of Food and Agriculture (Ghana)
Ministry of Foreign Affairs, an executive government agency in some countries which is responsible for foreign affairs
Mofa, a small moped or motorised bicycle.
Mofa 3, a Norwegian band
Mofa (Chinese: 末法, pinyin: Mòfǎ), or Mappo (Japanese), the Latter Day of the Law in Buddhism 
 Multi Option Fuze, Artillery.